Prince of Darkness is the third studio album by the English Gothic rock band Nosferatu. It is the band's first album to feature lead vocalist Dominic LaVey. The album was released September 1996 by Cleopatra Records in the United States and Canada, and in August 1996 in the United Kingdom and Germany on Hades Records.

Track listing

Credits and personnel
Damien DeVille: Lead guitar, keyboards and drum machine programming
Dominic LaVey: Vocals and keyboards
Dante Savarelle: Bass Guitar

References 

1996 albums
Nosferatu (band) albums
Cleopatra Records albums

ru:Prince of Darkness